Bill Davies (birth unknown – death unknown) was a Welsh rugby union and rugby league footballer who played in the 1940s.

Davies started his career as a rugby union player at Neath RFC. In 1939, he switched codes from rugby union to rugby league when he joined Huddersfield.

Davies played  in Huddersfield's 4-13 defeat by Wigan in the Championship Final during the 1945–46 season at Maine Road, Manchester on Saturday 18 May 1946.

In the first full season after the war, a new record transfer fee of £1,650 was set when Dewsbury bought Davies from Huddersfield, (based on increases in average earnings, this would be approximately £235,500 in 2014).

Bill Davies won 6 caps for Wales in 1943–1947 while at Huddersfield.

References

External links

Army XIII rugby league players
Dewsbury Rams players
Huddersfield Giants players
Place of birth missing
Place of death missing
Rugby league centres
Rugby league five-eighths
Rugby league fullbacks
Wales national rugby league team players
Welsh rugby league players
Year of birth missing
Year of death missing